The ABA League Finals MVP award, also known as the Adriatic League Finals MVP award (formerly the Final Four MVP), is an annual award that is given to the most valuable player of the finals of the European regional Adriatic ABA League, which is the top-tier level professional basketball league for countries of the former Yugoslavia. The award has been given since the 2001–02 ABA League season.

Winners

See also
ABA League MVP
ABA League Top Scorer
ABA League Top Prospect
ABA League Ideal Starting Five
Player of the Month

References

External links
 Adriatic ABA League official website
 Adriatic ABA League page at Eurobasket.com

Finals Mvp